The Mizoram Board of School Education (MBSE) is an autonomous governmental body for academic administration in Mizoram, India, having its jurisdiction from elementary to higher secondary education. It was established by the Government of Mizoram (then the Union Territory of India) in 1975 by the Mizoram Board of School Education Act. It has the power to regulate, supervise and control school education in Mizoram. Its primary function is to prepare academic programmes and organise examinations, especially for state level High School Leaving Certificate (HSLC) and Higher Secondary School Leaving Certificate (HSSLC). From 2012, the board also conducts State Technical Entrance Examination (STEE) for entry into technical courses such as engineering, medicine, veterinary science, pharmacy, nursing, homoeopathy, and dentistry.

In March 2012, Rev Dr Lalchungnunga, a retired principal of Serampore College, became the chairman.

History

The Mizoram Board of School Education was established in 1975 by the MBSE Act. The act was approved by the Legislative Assembly of the Mizoram Union Territory, at that time the administrative head was the Chief Executive Member Ch. Chhunga. The board as an autonous authority in education started functioning on 2 December 1976.

The board

According to the MBSE (Second Amendment) Act 2008, the governing board consists of:
 The chairman, who is the chairman of MBSE
 Member secretary, who is the state Secretary of education
 Director of Higher and Technical Education
 Director of Art and Culture
 Director of Sports and Youth Services
 Director of Agriculture
 Director of Health Services
 Engineer-in-chief, Public Works Department
 Joint director, SCERT
 One principal of a college in Mizoram
 Principal, College of Teachers' Education
 One principal from District Institute of Education & Training
 One district education officer
 Registrar, Mizoram University
In addition members are appointed from any principal of higher secondary school, headmaster of high school, headmaster of middle school, representative of each district council, one Member of Legislative Assembly, and one female educationist.

Function

The most important functions of MBSE are:
 it provides recognition to schools and institutes, and also monitors their administrative work
 it maintain quality education by prescribing curricular structure and recommending textbooks
 it takes the responsibility of conducting exams and publishes results
 it maintains co-ordination with the state government for any educational matters
 it motivates students and as well as teachers by conducting interactive programs
 it prescribes syllabus for its regular and vocational courses
 it regulates examinations for both regular and private candidates

References

External links
 Mizoram Educational Scenario

State secondary education boards of India
Education in Mizoram
1975 establishments in Mizoram
Government agencies established in 1975